Verkhniachka (previously named Stari Korchaky) is an urban-type settlement located in Uman Raion (district) of Cherkasy Oblast (province) in central Ukraine. It belongs to Khrystynivka urban hromada with the administration in the town of Khrystynivka, one of the hromadas of Ukraine. Population: 

Until 18 July 2020, Verkhniachka belonged to Khrystynivka Raion. The raion was abolished in July 2020 as part of the administrative reform of Ukraine, which reduced the number of raions of Cherkasy Oblast to four. The area of Khrystynivka Raion was merged into Uman Raion.

References

External links 
 

Urban-type settlements in Uman Raion
Populated places established in 1960
Umansky Uyezd